Jakub Krejčík (born June 25, 1991) is a Czech professional ice hockey defenseman who is currently playing with HC Sparta Praha of the Czech Extraliga (ELH).

Playing career
Krejčík first played with HC Slavia Praha in the Czech Extraliga during the 2010–11 season, and later moved to the Swedish Hockey League with Örebro HK.

On 8 May 2020, Krejčík was signed to a two-year contract to join Finnish KHL club, Jokerit, starting from the 2020–21 season.

On 14 July 2021, Krejčík and Jokerit mutually agreed to a contract termination. He was later signed to continue in the KHL with HC Dinamo Minsk on a one-year contract on 20 August 2021.

References

External links

1991 births
Living people
Czech ice hockey defencemen
HC Dinamo Minsk players
BK Havlíčkův Brod players
Jokerit players
HC Lev Praha players
Oulun Kärpät players
HC Kometa Brno players
KHL Medveščak Zagreb players
Lukko players
Örebro HK players
HC Slavia Praha players
HC Slovan Ústečtí Lvi players
HC Sparta Praha players
Ice hockey people from Prague
Czech expatriate ice hockey players in Sweden
Czech expatriate ice hockey players in Finland
Czech expatriate sportspeople in Croatia
Czech expatriate sportspeople in Belarus
Expatriate ice hockey players in Belarus
Expatriate ice hockey players in Croatia